Toby Green is a British historian who is a Professor of Precolonial and Lusophone African History and Culture at King's College London. He obtained his Doctor of Philosophy in African studies at the University of Birmingham. He is Chair of the Fontes Historiae Africanae Committee of the British Academy, and has written extensively about African early modern history and colonial African slavery, mainly focussed on slavery in the Portuguese colonies.

He has also written on the Spanish Inquisition. Green disagrees with the notion of a Black Legend of the Spanish Inquisition and often quotes sixteenth-century sources regarding the institution's abuse of power in Latin America, and is often cited regarding this subject. He has other publications regarding the issues of religious prosecution and oppression in Africa and other European colonies.
His interests are slavery in the Atlantic and cultural and economic links between America and Africa.

His book A Fistful of Shells won the 2019 Nayef Al-Rodhan Prize for Global Cultural Understanding and was shortlisted for the 2020 Wolfson History Prize.

Views on the Spanish Inquisition

Green addresses the Spanish Inquisition mainly through Hispano-American sources. He notes that the great unchecked power given to inquisitors meant that they were "widely seen as above the law" and sometimes had motives for imprisoning and sometimes executing alleged offenders other than for the purpose of punishing religious nonconformity, mainly in Iberoamerica.

Publications

Articles

Baculamento or Encomienda?: Legal Pluralisms and the Contestation of Power in Pan-Atlantic World of the Sixteenth and Seventeenth Centuries
Green, T. 28 Sep 2017 In : Journal of Global Slavery. 2, p. 310-336
“Africa and the Price Revolution: Currency Imports and Socioeconomic Change in West And West-Central Africa During the 17th Century”, Journal of African History, 57/1 (2016), 1-24.
“Beyond an Imperial Atlantic: Trajectories of Africans From Upper Guinea and West-Central Africa in the Early Atlantic World", Past and Present 230 (Feb 2016), 91-122
“Beyond an Imperial Atlantic: Trajectories of Africans From Upper Guinea and West-Central Africa in the Early Atlantic World", Past and Present 230 (Feb 2016), 91-122
 Brokers of Change: Atlantic Commerce and Cultures in Pre-Colonial Western Africa (Oxford University Press, for the British Academy: 2012)
“Building Slavery in the Atlantic World: Atlantic Connections and the Changing Institution of Slavery in Cabo Verde, 15th-16th Centuries”, Slavery and Abolition 32/2, 2011, 227-45:

Major books (selected only)

 Saddled with Darwin: A Journey through South America on Horseback (1999) 
 Meeting the Invisible Man: Secrets and Magic in West Africa (2001) 
 Thomas More's Magician: A Novel Account of Utopia in Mexico (2004) 
The Inquisition: The Reign of Fear (2007) 
The Rise of the Transatlantic Slave Trade in Western Africa (2012)
A Fistful of Shells: West Africa from the Rise of the Slave Trade to the Age of Revolution (2019) 
The Covid Consensus: The Politics of Global Inequality (2021)

Further reading 
A Fistful of Shells by Toby Green review – the west African slave trade - The Guardian

What heart of darkness? Busting myths about West African history - The Telegraph

References 

1974 births
Living people
Academics of King's College London
Alumni of the University of Birmingham